Tarkan Versus the Vikings is a 1971 Turkish action film, directed by Ertem Eğilmez based on a comic strip by Sezgin Burak, starring Kartal Tibet as  fictional Hunnic warrior Tarkan, who vows revenge against Viking raiders after they ambush him and leave him for dead.

External links
 

1971 films
Turkish action films
1970s Turkish-language films
Films set in Turkey
Films set in the 5th century
Films based on Turkish comics
Live-action films based on comics
Turkish sequel films